The Nokia 6710 Navigator is a smartphone made by Nokia, announced on 16 February 2009. that is a successor to Nokia 6210 Navigator. It was released in August 2009. The Nokia 6710 Navigator is the fourth device in the Navigator series to be released by Nokia. The Nokia 6710 Navigator includes pre-loaded navigation maps with a lifetime free navigation license.

It runs on Symbian 9.3 with a S60 3rd Edition FP2 interface.

Although being a Navigator, it included many high-end features usually seen on other series, such as its 5 megapixel camera, front camera, the 3.5 mm jack and its fast 600 MHz CPU.

Technical specifications
Symbian OS v9.3 with S60 Platform 3rd Edition, Feature Pack 2
Quad-band GSM / GPRS / EDGE: GSM/EDGE 850/900/1800/1900 MHz
Tri band UMTS / HSDPA: W-CDMA 900/1900/2100 MHz
HSDPA 10.2 Mbit/s
HSUPA 2.0 Mbit/s
Integrated GPS system
A-GPS
Digital Compass
128 MB RAM
5.0 megapixel camera, video – VGA 640 × 480
QVGA camera for video calling
Bluetooth 2.0 with EDR & A2DP
USB 2.0 (micro USB)
microSD
Stereo FM radio with support for RDS and Visual Radio
Push to Talk over Cellular (PoC)
Music Player supporting MP3, AAC, AAC+, eAAC+, WMA, WAV, RealAudio 7, RealAudio 8, RealAudio 10, AMR, MIDI files
Mono speaker

See also
 List of Nokia products

References

External links

 NAVTEQ Website
 Nokia Website
 Nokia 6710 Navigator - Official Site
 Nokia 6710 Navigator - Technical Spesifications

Nokia smartphones
Mobile phones introduced in 2009
Slider phones